Martin Hromkovič (born 27 May 1982) is a Slovak football defender who currently plays for OFC Russel Gabčíkovo.

External links
Eurofotbal profile

References

1982 births
Living people
Slovak footballers
Association football defenders
FK Inter Bratislava players
ŠK Senec players
MFK Vítkovice players
FK Slovan Duslo Šaľa players
Slovak Super Liga players
Expatriate footballers in the Czech Republic
Expatriate footballers in Germany
Footballers from Bratislava